Masi-Manimba Airport  is an airport serving the town of Masi-Manimba in Kwilu Province, Democratic Republic of the Congo.

See also

Transport in the Democratic Republic of the Congo
List of airports in the Democratic Republic of the Congo

References

External links
 OpenStreetMap - Masi-Manimba
 OurAirports - Masi-Manimba
 Masi-Manimba
 Great Circle Mapper - Masi-Manimba
 HERE Maps - Masi-Manimba
 

Airports in Kwilu Province